The second series of Gladiators began airing on Seven Network on 2 September 1995.

Fifteen episodes were filmed for this series. Once again the shows were filmed at the Brisbane Entertainment Centre between 5 July and 19 July.

Kimberley Joseph returned to host along with Mike Hammond, who replaced Aaron Pedersen. Play-by-play commentary was again performed by Tony Schibeci. John Alexander was unable to return due to his commitments to Wimbledon and was replaced by Mike Whitney. Once again, John Forsyth acted as assistant referee and the Kix cheerleaders returned to perform in the background of the events. In Heats 2 and 8, Forsyth was absent for unknown reasons, and was replaced by Neil Waldron for those Heats.

Winners of the heats received a Sony PlayStation and sound system with CDs. Runners-up received a titanium watch. The grand final winners won a car.

Gladiators

Male
 Commando - Geoff Barker
 Condor - Alistair Gibb
 Cougar - Ashley Buck
 Hammer - Mark McGaw
 Predator - Tony Forrow
 Taipan - Michael Melksham
 Tower - Ron Reeve
 Vulcan - John Seru

Force (John Gergelifi) retired after Series 1 due to injury. In his place were two new recruits, Commando and Predator.

Female
 Blade - Bev Carter
 Cheeta - Nicky Davico
 Delta - Karen Alley
 Flame - Lynda Byrnes
 Fury - Julie Saunders
 Rebel - Barbara Kendell
 Storm - Charlene Machin

Events

Atlasphere, Duel, Gauntlet, Hang Tough, Hit & Run, Powerball, Pyramid, Suspension Bridge, Tilt and Wall returned from Series 1, as well as the Eliminator which featured as the final event in every show.

Three new events, Swingshot, Pursuit and Whiplash were introduced all of them having already featured in either or both of the American or British TV series.

Shows

Once again fifteen shows were filmed in a progressive competition. Each show featured four events along with the Eliminator. The winner of the Eliminator would progress to the next round.

Kimberley and Mike stood with the winners of the show as they said their goodbyes.

Winning challengers are in bold.

1Replaced Bernadine after she was injured in Powerball.
2This episode would mark Tilt's last appearance in the show.
3Mark was injured after falling from Hang Tough and withdrew from the competition before the Eliminator.
4Replaced Sandra after she was injured on Pyramid.
5This marks Rebel's last appearance as a Gladiator.

Episode summary

Heat 1
Original airdate: 2 September 1995 
Challengers: Leanne Hickey v Bernadine Wilde/Jillian Ikin, Tommy Le v Rowan Cameron

Eliminator
Female: 5 second head start for Jillian
Male: 8.5 second head start for Rowan
Winners: Leanne Hickey & Tommy Le

1 Bernadine was injured following a tackle from Cheeta in Powerball, Jillian Ikin played the remainder of the games

Heat 2
Original airdate: 9 September 1995 
Challengers: Kathy McMorrow v Claire Sudran, Scott Brewer v Jonathon Dunne

Eliminator
Female: 5 second head start for Kathy
Male: 1 second head start for Jonathan
Winners: Kathy McMorrow & Scott Brewer

Heat 3
Original airdate: 16 September 1995 
Challengers: Kim McGaw v Charity Crosby, Kris Lacey v Kane Winther

Eliminator
Female: 4 second head start for Charity
Male: 1.5 second head start for Kris
Winners: Charity Crosby & Kris Lacey

Heat 4
Original airdate: 23 September 1995 
Challengers: Donna Talbot v Kim Knott, Scott Bannan v Neil Campbell

Eliminator
Female: No headstart
Male: 0.5 second head start for Neil
Winners: Kim Knott & Neil Campbell

Heat 5
Original airdate: 30 September 1995 
Challengers: Lourene Bevaart v Rhona Broughton, Martin Ryan v Dominic Deligny

Eliminator
Female: 8.5 second head start for Lourene
Male: No head start
Winners: Lourene Bevaart & Dominic Deligny

Heat 6
Original airdate: 7 October 1995 
Challengers: Melanie Sawtell v Karen Trent, Mark Laboyrie v Joe Lukowski

Eliminator
Female: No head start
Male: Mark is injured in Hang Tough and cannot run eliminator
Winners: Joe Lukowski & Karen Trent

Heat 7
Original airdate: 14 October 1995 
Challengers: Nicholle Singleton v Tamzin Van De Weg, Steve Smith v Russell Perring

Eliminator
Female: 5 second head start for Nicholle
Male: 2 second head start for Steve
Winners: Nicholle Singleton & Steve Smith

Heat 8
Original airdate: 21 October 1995 
Challengers: Sandra Nori v Bellinda Panizza, Shane Saltmarsh v Matthew Dugard

Eliminator
Female: 2.5 second head start for Bellinda
Male: 9.5 second head start for Shane
Winners: Sandra Nori & Shane Saltmarsh

Quarter-Final 1
Original airdate: 28 October 1995 
Challengers: Kathy McMorrow v Kim Knott, Shane Saltmarsh v Neil Campbell

Eliminator
Female: 7.5 second head start for Kathy
Male: 0.5 second head start for Shane
Winners: Kathy McMorrow & Shane Saltmarsh

Quarter-Final 2
Original airdate: 4 November 1995 
Challengers: Charity Crosby v Sandra Nori/Claire Sudran, Dominique Deligny v Scott Brewer

Eliminator
Female: 5 second head start for Charity
Male: 10 second head start for Scott
Winners: Charity Crosby & Scott Brewer

Quarter-Final 3
Original airdate: 11 November 1995 
Challengers: Lourene Bevaart v Nicholle Singleton, Tommy Le v Joe Lukowski

Eliminator
Female: 5.5 second head start for Lourene
Male: 10.5 second head start for Joe
Winners: Lourene Bevaart & Joe Lukowski

Quarter-Final 4
Original airdate: 18 November 1995 
Challengers: Leanne Hickey v Karen Trent, Kris Lacey v Steve Smith

Eliminator
Female: 2 second head start for Karen
Male: No head start
Winners: Karen Trent & Kris Lacey

Semi-final 1
Original airdate: 25 November 1995 
Challengers: Lourene Bevaart v Karen Trent, Joe Lukowski v Scott Brewer

Eliminator
Female: 2.5 second head start for Karen 
Male: 4.5 second head start for Joe
Winners: Lourene Bevaart & Joe Lukowski

Semi-final 2
Original airdate: 25 November 1995 
Challengers: Kathy McMorrow v Charity Crosby, Kris Lacey v Shane Saltmarsh

Eliminator
Female: 7 second head start for Kathy
Male: 4 second head start for Shane
Winners: Kathy McMorrow & Shane Saltmarsh

Grand Final
Original airdate: 2 December 1995Challengers: Lourene Bevaart v Kathy McMorrow, Shane Saltmarsh v Joe Lukowski

Eliminator

Female: 7 second start for Lourene
Male: 2.5 second start for Shane
Series 2 Winners: Lourene Bevaart & Shane Saltmarsh

Production

Production began in May 1995 following the instant success of the first series. Tryouts were held in May whilst the producers decided to bring in new events. Filming began in the Brisbane Entertainment Centre on 5 July with audience figures of 5,000. Former Gladiator Force attended the Series Two Wrap Party.

Series two began broadcast in August 1995 with production for the next series beginning in October.

References

1995 Australian television seasons
series two